= Waymans Ridge =

Ridge in West Virginia, US

Coordinates: 39.9111869°N 80.6695257°W

Waymans Ridge is a ridge in the U.S. state of West Virginia.

Waymans Ridge has the name of the Wayman family which settled there.
